Asif Iqbal (born: 12 October) is a Bangladeshi lyricist and composer. He is one of the successful corporate personality in Bangladesh. He has been acclaimed for his multifaceted and innovative work in several renowned institutions of the country.

Life and career
Asif Iqbal was born at Kanchana Union under Satkania Upazila in Chittagong district. He has been writing songs for almost 30 years. He is most remembered for his film and album songs. In 2017, he was awarded Best Lyricist at 12th Channel i Music Awards. 
He was also selected as the best lyricist for the 7th BMJA "Music Awards - 2019" for 2019.

He penned the hit song Shada Ar Laal, sung by Asif Akbar and composed the soundtrack of Voyonkor Sundor, an Animesh Aich film. Naqib Khan, Bappa Majumder, James, Pertho Barua, Shakila Zafar, Konak Chapa, Fahmida Nabi, Nancy, Kona, Mahadi, Elita, Rinku, Nishita, Parvez, Ronti, Shafiq Tuhin, Balam, Sabbir have sung various songs written by him. He was the Executive Director (Marketing) of Meghna Group of Industries. He is also the founder and owner of the music production company Ganchil. He has also taught in the marketing departments of the private Eastwest and Southeast Universities. Currently he works as the CEO of Building Technology and Ideas (bti).

Awards
 Channel i Music Awards 2017 - Best lyricist
 BMJA Music Award 2019 - Best lyricist
 Channel i Music Awards 2022 - Best lyricist

References

Living people
Bangladeshi film score composers
Bangladeshi songwriters
Bangladeshi lyricists
Year of birth missing (living people)
People from Chittagong
University of Dhaka alumni
Chittagong College alumni